Never Going Back is the tenth studio album from Country singer Collin Raye. The album was released on April 28, 2009 through Time Life Entertainment.

Track listing

 "Get Up in Jesus' Name" (Mike Curtis, Marty Raybon) - 3:41 
 "The Only Jesus" (Curtis, Collin Raye) - 3:20 
 "Mid-Life Chrysler" (Tony Martin, Wendell Mobley, Neil Thrasher) - 3:46 
 "You Get Me" (Mobley, Thrasher) - 3:29 
 "Never Going Back" (Curtis, Troy Powers, C. Raye, Brittany Raye) - 4:58 
 "Take Care of You" (Aimee Mayo, Mobley, Thrasher) - 3:45 
 "The Cross" (Curtis) - 3:25 
 "She's with Me" (C. Raye) - 4:11 
 "I Love You This Much" (Austin Cunningham, Thrasher) - 3:43 
 "Indescribable" (Laura Story) - 4:13

Personnel

 Mark Beckett – drums, percussion
 Michael A. Curtis – background vocals
 Donald Clive Davidson – violin
 Connie Ellisor – violin
 Jim Gray – string arrangements, string conductor
 Jim Grosjean – viola
 John Hobbs – keyboards, Hammond organ, piano
 Anthony LaMarchina – cello
 Lenny LeBlanc – background vocals
 Gary Lunn – bass guitar
 James Mitchell – electric guitar
 Michael Pyle – background vocals
 Collin Raye – lead vocals, background vocals
 Joel Reist – double bass
 Scotty Sanders – steel guitar
 Pamela Sixfin – string contractor, violin
 Michael Spriggs – acoustic guitar, gut string guitar
 Doug Stokes – drums, percussion
 Julie Tanner – cello
 Alan Umstead – viola
 Bob Wray – bass guitar

Awards

At the 41st GMA Dove Awards, Never Going Back was nominated for a Dove Award for Country Album of the Year.

Chart performance

References

2009 albums
Collin Raye albums